Bâloise Holding AG is a Swiss insurance holding company headquartered in Basel. The company employs approximately 9,000 employees across Europe and is the third-largest Swiss all-industry insurance service provider for individuals and businesses.

History
The Basler Versicherungen was founded in 1863 as Basler Versicherungsgesellschaft gegen Feuerschaden, insuring inhabitants of Basel against damage from fire. This was prompted by the tragic fire incident in Glarus. In the following year, the company already expanded to covering life and transportation, as well as expanding geographically within Switzerland and abroad. At the end of the decade, the insurer added its own reinsurance business to the portfolio.

By the early 20th century, the business was booming and the company even dabbled in the U.S. market. However, they had exited the U.S. again by the time of the 1906 San Francisco earthquake, avoiding any insurance loss created by that natural catastrophe. World War I presented a difficult time to do business, but Baloise was able to continue expanding internationally even during the depression before World War II. During the War, the headquarters were evacuated due to proximity to both the French and German border and 115 tons of files were moved to a secure location protected by the Swiss army near Saanen. After the war, Baloise was able to grow as part of Europe's economic advances and in 1962, the separate parts of the business all became part of holding structure.

The 1970s and 1980s brought new international subsidiaries, such as in Austria, and acquisitions, including Deutscher Ring Leben in Germany, a majority stake in Mercator in Belgium, and the Providence Washington Insurance Company in the U.S. Many of these businesses were later sold, while new ones were acquired.

In 2007, baloisedirect.ch was launched as the company's online insurance provider, offering insurance for vehicles, personal liability insurance, home contents insurance, legal expenses insurance and travel insurance.

Holding Structure

Bâloise Holding operates in Europe through various subsidiaries:

 : Basler Versicherungen Schweiz, Baloise Bank SoBa, Baloise Asset Management, Baloise Fund Invest
 : Basler Versicherungen, Deutscher Ring
 : Baloise Life
 : Baloise Insurance
 : Bâloise Assurances

The company is listed on the SIX Swiss Exchange. The biggest shareholders of Bâloise are Chase Nominees and BlackRock. 

On January 1, 2015, Gert De Winter took the post as CEO from Martin Strobel.

References

External links
Official website of the online insurance

Financial services companies established in 1863
Companies based in Basel
Insurance companies of Switzerland
Companies listed on the SIX Swiss Exchange